Haverfordwest Museum is a local history and heritage museum in Haverfordwest, Pembrokeshire.  Collections include local and social history, the history of the castle, and a selection of local art. The museum is housed in the former governor's house, a Grade II listed building, said to date from 1779 inside Haverfordwest Castle and facing the former town prison. 

In 2012 Pembrokeshire County Council decided to sell the current site for use commercially, and relocate the museum to another site. The site has not been sold and the museum is still open.

References

External links
Official site

Houses completed in 1779
History of Pembrokeshire
Museums in Pembrokeshire
Grade II listed buildings in Pembrokeshire
Local museums in Wales
Haverfordwest